Herbert William Weekes (8 May 1841 – 21 November 1914) was a well-known English genre and animal painter of the Victorian Neoclassical period who specialized in portraying animals in humorous, human-like situations.

Early life and family
Weekes was born in Pimlico, London, England to a prominent artistic family: the youngest of five children, his father, Henry Weekes, Sr. (1807–1877), was a sculptor and Royal Academician; his brother, Henry, Jr. (fl. 1850–1884), was also a genre painter known for his animal studies; and his brother, Frederick (1833–1920), was an artist and expert on medieval costume and design.

Later life and career
Weekes appears to have used his middle name, William, for all but formal purposes. He lived and worked for most of his life in London, at 21 Oppidans Road, Primrose Hill. In 1865, he married artist Caroline Anne Henshaw (born ca. 1844), of Hammersmith.

Known as an animal and genre painter of the Victorian Neoclassical style, Weekes' work was popular, and helped expand 19th century animal painting from its traditional role of simply recording beasts into a way of reflecting human life. He frequently personified animals and placed them in situations particular to humans. His work shows a sensitive understanding of his subject matter, and part of his success in capturing the peaceful country atmosphere depicted in so many of his paintings lay in his affection for it. He was greatly influenced by one of the foremost animal painters of the nineteenth century, Sir Edwin Henry Landseer.

Weekes contributed illustrations for The Illustrated London News in 1883, and exhibited extensively in various London and provincial galleries. His works were well received - although not by everyone: a contemporary wit described his paintings as “Weekes' Weak Squeaks”.

His works were alternatively signed with the initials 'WW' (sometimes overlaid), 'W. Weekes', 'William Weekes', 'Herbert William Weekes', 'H.W. Weekes', 'H. Weekes', and simply 'Weekes'. They were exhibited in a variety of venues from 1864 to 1904, with frequencies as follows:
Royal Academy (59)
Walker Art Gallery, Liverpool (15)
Royal Society of British Artists (10)
Royal Institute of Oil Painters (8)
Royal Birmingham Society of Artists (6)
Arthur Tooth & Sons (3)
Manchester City Art Gallery (3)
Royal Glasgow Institute of the Fine Arts (2)
Fine Art Society (1)
Grosvenor Gallery (1)
Weekes died on 21 November 1914 and was buried on 28 November in Hampstead Cemetery (West Hampstead) - the grave is in Section C11 Grave 145, the service was performed by the Vicar of St Luke's Church Hampstead.

Works
This is an inexhaustive list of Weekes' paintings, primarily done in oil on canvas:

Acquainted With Whoa
A Meeting of the Savants
Anticipation
An Appeal to the Benevolent
The Apple Picker Takes A Tumble
An Appreciative Audience
The Avenged
Barnyard Friends
Best of Friends
A Bone of Contention
The Blockade
A Captive Audience
Christmas Greetings
Cold As Charity
Congratulations
Consulting the Oracle
A Critic
Court of Arbitration
Darby and Joan
Curiosity
The Disputed Gate
A Donkey and Geese Beside a Wheelbarrow
The Eviction
Farmyard Friends
Feeding the Pigs
Feeding Time
A Friendly Gathering
FowlTalk
Fox Terrier
A Giant Snowball
Giving Way
A Glimpse of the News
Going to the Dogs
The Good and the Bad Little Pig
Good Friends
Good Taste
The Grand Procession
In Great Difficulties
The Guardian of the Greens
Guarding the Chicks
Guilty Conscience
The Haggle
How Dare You
An Intruder
I Smell a Rat
Kennel Companions
The Little Calf
A Little Girl Feeding Geese
The Low Comedian's Reception
Mother and Foal
Music Hath Charms aka Music To Their Ears
My Lady's at Home
Not One of Us
Outnumbered
Patience is a virtue
The Patient and the Quacks
The Pawnbrokers
The Pig's Picnic
Piping the Piggies
Portrait of a Peasant Woman
Prattlers and Cracklers
Pride and Humility
Quiet!
The Sermon
A Siesta
A Snap for the Lot
A Spaniel Puppy
Stable Companions
Unpleasant for Both Parties
Street Acrobats 
A Stump Oration
Suspicion
A Sweet Thing
Taunting the Geese
Teaching the Puppy New Tricks
A Terrier
A Territorial Dispute
This Comes Hopping You Are Well
A Tug o War
Trespassers
Two of his Flock
Two Donkeys and a Carrion Crow
Two Smooth-Coated Fox Terriers
The Unruly Mob
The Unruly Neighbours
 Unwelcome Guest
An Unusual Visitor
An Urban Council
A Visitor
Waiting Is a Virtue
 Waiting our Turn
Washer Woman and Two Dandies
A Watchful Eye
A Wee Bit Frightened
Where Are They?
Which Way To Market?
Which Way to Cork?
You Are Sitting in My Nest

References

External links
WikiGallery entry for Herbert William Weekes

1841 births
1914 deaths
19th-century English painters
English male painters
20th-century English painters
British genre painters
Neoclassical painters
British neoclassical painters
Animal artists
People from Pimlico
20th-century English male artists
19th-century English male artists